Omni Coliseum (often called The Omni) was an indoor arena in Atlanta, Georgia, United States. Completed in 1972, the arena seated 16,378 for basketball and 15,278 for hockey. It was part of the Omni Complex, now known as the CNN Center.

It was the home arena for the Atlanta Hawks of the National Basketball Association from 1972 until the arena's closure in 1997, and the Atlanta Flames of the National Hockey League from their inception in 1972 until 1980, when the franchise was sold and relocated to Calgary, Alberta. It hosted the 1977 NCAA Division I men's basketball tournament, the 1988 Democratic National Convention, and the 1996 Summer Olympics indoor volleyball competition.

The Omni was closed and demolished in 1997. Its successor, Philips Arena (now State Farm Arena), was constructed on the Omni's site and opened in 1999.

History
The arena was considered an architectural marvel that combined innovative roof, seating, and structural designs. The logo is based on the unique seating arrangement. 

The exterior cladding was composed of Cor-Ten weathering steel, which is covered in rust; the idea was that the steel would continue to rust to the point where the rusted exterior would form a protective seal, making a solid steel structure that would last for decades. 

The Omni was noted for its distinctive space frame roof, often joked about as looking like an egg crate or a rusty waffle iron. Designed by the firm of tvsdesign with structural engineering work by the firm of Prybylowski and Gravino, the roof was technically described as an ortho-quad truss system.

Scoreboard
The only surviving component of the Omni is its scoreboard, which now hangs in the pavilion of the State Farm Arena. American Sign & Indicator (which became Trans-Lux) built the basketball-specific scoreboard in the early 1980s to replace the original hockey-specific scoreboard that Daktronics maintained during the 1990s. The arena also had four message boards in each end zone, two of which were animation boards.

Events

Professional wrestling
The Omni was a hotbed for professional wrestling. Since its opening, it was considered the home base for the NWA's Georgia Championship Wrestling, Jim Crockett Promotions, and World Championship Wrestling. Many major and historic wrestling events took place at the Omni, including Starrcade (1985, 1986, 1989 and 1992), the first WarGames match during the Great American Bash tour (1987), and the first Slamboree in 1993. The World Wrestling Federation also held many events at the Omni until their last card at the venue on November 2, 1992.

Basketball and hockey
The Omni was home to the NBA's Atlanta Hawks from 1972 to 1997. Their final game at the Omni was a Game 4 loss to Michael Jordan, and the Chicago Bulls in the Eastern Conference Semi-finals during the 1997 NBA Playoffs, 89–80 on May 11, 1997. The Omni was also home to the NHL's Atlanta Flames (now the Calgary Flames) from 1972 until 1980, and the Atlanta Knights of the IHL (1992–1996). In 1994, the Knights became the only pro team to win a championship in the building, when they won the Turner Cup.

In 1977, the arena hosted the NCAA Final Four, won by Marquette University over North Carolina. This was Warriors' coach Al McGuire's last game. It also hosted one SEC and three ACC men's basketball tournaments, the 1978 NBA All-Star Game, the 1993 NCAA Women's Basketball Final Four, and the indoor volleyball matches for the 1996 Summer Olympics.

Indoor soccer
The Omni was the indoor home of the Atlanta Chiefs of the North American Soccer League, as well as the Atlanta Attack of the American Indoor Soccer Association.

Concerts
The Omni was Atlanta's primary concert venue from 1972 to 1997. The Grateful Dead played The Omni 24 times between 1973 and 1995, more than any other musical act.
Madonna brought both her Virgin Tour in 1985 and her Who's That Girl World Tour in 1987 to the Omni Coliseum. Elvis Presley played 12 sell out shows between June 1973 and December 1976. Judas Priest has also played this venue on a few occasions. Def Leppard recorded footage from the October 7–9, 1988 shows at the Omni for their In the Round, in Your Face video. Paul McCartney and Wings played at the Omni on May 18, 1976 and May 19, 1976, during their Wings Over the World tour. Paul McCartney returned to the Omni with his band for concerts on February 18, 1990 and February 19, 1990. George Harrison played two concerts on November 24, 1974, on his only North American solo tour.

Other events
Among the major non-sports events at the Omni was the 1988 Democratic National Convention, where delegates nominated Michael Dukakis and Lloyd Bentsen for President and Vice President of the United States, respectively.

Problems

The Omni did not last nearly as long as many other arenas built during the same time period, in part because a number of its innovations did not work as intended. The most serious problem was the weathered steel exterior, which could not withstand Atlanta's humid climate. Rather than provide a protective seal, it never stopped rusting. In fact, it corroded much more quickly than was anticipated. Gaping holes eventually formed in the walls, which made it possible for non-paying fans to climb through. Chain link fences were installed to prevent this, but did little to hide the damage. Thus, the structure began to look dated by the early 1990s, despite being only 20 years old.

Built on a former railroad yard, the Omni settled more than its designers expected. There were unanticipated stresses in the space frame roof, which often leaked water.

In the late 1980s and early 1990s, a growing number of NBA and NHL teams began to construct arenas with better amenities for their high-end customers to increase revenue. These amenities included luxury boxes, club seating, and massive club concourses. Some of these new arenas had as many as 200 luxury boxes. By comparison, the Omni had only 16 luxury boxes and no club level. It also became a disadvantage during Atlanta's explosive population growth.

Although the Omni hosted many events, it lost more than its share due to the smaller capacity and lack of amenities compared to newer buildings in other cities. By the start of the 1990s, an effort began to build a replacement. A new arena would have likely been needed in any event due to the Omni's structural problems. This also stemmed from Ted Turner's desire to own an NHL franchise; the Flames had been sold to Canadian businessmen and relocated to Calgary, Alberta a decade earlier. The NHL determined the Omni was not suitable even as a temporary facility, and would only grant Atlanta an expansion team if Turner guaranteed a brand-new arena would be in place by the time the new team took the ice. 

Despite the arena's close proximity to the CNN Center, Georgia World Congress Center, and the Omni MARTA station, the Omni was imploded on July 26, 1997. Philips Arena (now State Farm Arena) was constructed in its place, and opened on September 18, 1999. The demolition of the Omni forced the Hawks to split their home games for the 1997–98 and 1998–99 seasons between the Alexander Memorial Coliseum at Georgia Tech (their first home in Atlanta), and the Georgia Dome.

References

External links

1996 Summer Olympics official report. Volume 1. p. 543.
1996 Summer Olympics official report. Volume 3. p. 465.

1972 establishments in Georgia (U.S. state)
Venues of the 1996 Summer Olympics
1997 disestablishments in Georgia (U.S. state)
Atlanta Flames
Atlanta Hawks venues
o
Basketball venues in Georgia (U.S. state)
Defunct indoor arenas in the United States
Defunct indoor ice hockey venues in the United States
Defunct indoor soccer venues in the United States
Former National Basketball Association venues
Defunct National Hockey League venues
Defunct sports venues in Georgia (U.S. state)
Demolished buildings and structures in Atlanta
Demolished music venues in the United States
Demolished sports venues in Georgia (U.S. state)
Indoor ice hockey venues in the United States
Olympic volleyball venues
Sports venues completed in 1972
Sports venues demolished in 1997
Sports venues in Atlanta
North American Soccer League (1968–1984) indoor venues
Volleyball venues in the United States
NCAA Division I men's basketball tournament Final Four venues
Buildings and structures demolished by controlled implosion